Margaret Morley may refer to:

Margaret S. Morley (1938–2016), New Zealand malacologist
Margaret Warner Morley (1858–1923), American educator, biologist, and children's book author